Alpha to coverage is a multisampling computer graphics technique, that replaces alpha blending with a coverage mask. This achieves order-independent transparency for when anti-aliasing or semi-transparent textures are used. This particular technique is useful for situations where dense foliage or grass must be rendered in a video game.

Alpha to coverage multisampling is based on regular multisampling, except that the alpha coverage mask is  ANDed with the multisample mask. Alpha-to-coverage converts the alpha component output from the pixel shader to a coverage mask. When the multisampling is applied each output fragment gets a transparency of 0 or 1 depending on alpha coverage and the multisampling result.

See also
 Alpha test (computer graphics)
 Spatial anti-aliasing
 Multisample anti-aliasing
 Color depth

References

External links
 GPU Gems 3 ‒ Chapter 4. Next-Generation SpeedTree Rendering
 Street Fighter IV PC explained in detail

Image processing
Computer graphic artifacts